Pelican Island may refer to:

Australia
 Pelican Island (Tasmania)
 Pelican Island (Kimberley coast)
 Pelican Island (Shark Bay)  
 Pelican Island (Houtman Abrolhos)  
 Pelican Island (Albany coast)

United States
 Pelican Island (California), a former island in Tulare Lake
 Pelican Island (New Jersey)
 Pelican Island (Texas), near Galveston
 Pelican Island National Wildlife Refuge, Florida
 Pelican Cay, United States Virgin Islands

Elsewhere
 Pelican Island, Antigua and Barbuda
 Pelican Island (Barbados)
 Pelican Island (British Virgin Islands)
 Isla Pelicano in the Bolivar Department of Colombia
 Pelican Island, an islet in Palmyra Atoll, part of the US Minor Islands
 Pelikan Rock, Sint Maarten
 Pelican Cay (Saint Vincent and the Grenadines)
 Pelican Island (Trinidad and Tobago)

Literature
 "The Pelican Island" (1828), a poem by James Montgomery